Hillsborough Forest is a mixed broadleaf and coniferous forest located near the village of Hillsborough in County Down, Northern Ireland. It was once part of the Hillsborough Castle demesne. The lake located in the forest park contains brown trout and rainbow trout.

The forest contains the remains of the Fox Fort rath.

References

Forests and woodlands of Northern Ireland